David Almond  (born 15 May 1951) is a British author who has written many novels for children and young adults from 1998, each one receiving critical acclaim.

He is one of thirty children's writers, and one of three from the UK, to win the biennial, international Hans Christian Andersen Award.
For the 70th anniversary of the British Carnegie Medal in 2007, his debut novel Skellig (1998) was named one of the top ten Medal-winning works, selected by a panel to compose the ballot for a public election of the all-time favourite. It ranked third in the public vote from that shortlist.

Early life and education

Almond was born in Newcastle upon Tyne in 1951 and raised in neighbouring Felling. His father was an office manager in an engineering factory and his mother a shorthand typist. He was raised Catholic at St Joseph's Catholic Academy and had four sisters and one brother. As a child, he dreamed of becoming a writer and "wrote stories and stitched them into little books." He describes his childhood as one with "much joy" but also "much sadness," losing his younger sister and father at a young age.

He was educated at the University of East Anglia and Newcastle Polytechnic. After graduating, Almond worked as a teacher for five years; he then moved to an artists' commune in Norfolk and concentrated on his writing. He returned to Newcastle and worked as a part-time special-needs teacher while editing the literary journal Panurge.

Career

Almond published his first collection of stories in 1985, Sleepless Nights. His second collection, A Kind of Heaven, appeared in 1987.  He then wrote a series of stories which drew on his own childhood, and which would eventually be published as Counting Stars, published by Hodder in 2000. In the next seven years, four more novels by Almond made the Carnegie Medal shortlist of five to eight books. 
Since Skellig his novels, stories, and plays have also brought international success and widespread critical acclaim. They are Kit's Wilderness (1999), Heaven Eyes (2000),  Secret Heart (2001), The Fire Eaters (2003), Clay (2005), Jackdaw Summer (2008), and My Name is Mina (2010), a prequel to Skellig. He collaborates with leading artists and illustrators, including Polly Dunbar (My Dad's a Birdman and The Boy Who Climbed Into the Moon); Stephen Lambert (Kate, the Cat and the Moon;) and Dave McKean (The Savage, Slog's Dad and the   forthcoming Mouse Bird Snake Wolf). His plays include Wild Girl, Wild Boy, My Dad's a Birdman, Noah & the Fludd and the stage adaptations of Skellig and Heaven Eyes.

Almond's novel The True Tale of the Monster Billy Dean (2011) was published in two editions: Adult (Penguin Viking); and Young Adult (Puffin). 2012 publications include The Boy Who Swam With Piranhas (illustrated by Oliver Jeffers). In 2013, Mouse Bird Snake Wolf (illustrated by Dave McKean) was published.

His works are highly philosophical and thus appeal to children and adults alike. Recurring themes throughout include the complex relationships between apparent opposites (such as life and death, reality and fiction, past and future); forms of education; growing up and adapting to change; the nature of the "self". He won the Hans Christian Andersen Award for his writing, which biennially recognises the "lasting contribution" of one living author. (He had been one of five finalists in 2008.)
The jury president, Ms Zohreh Ghaeni from Iran, observed that Almond "writes about children in crisis, while continuously giving hope to them", and cited in particular his first two novels, Skellig and Kit's Wilderness. She called "bibliotherapy" such as she attributed to Almond "a vital activity for all children around the world."
When it named him a finalist months before, the international jury cited his "deeply philosophical novels that appeal to children and adults alike, and encourage readers by his use of magic realism".
For his body of work Almond was also a British nominee for the Astrid Lindgren Award at the same time.
He is Professor of Creative Writing at Bath Spa University.

Honours and awards
Almond's major awards include the Hans Christian Andersen Award, Carnegie Medal (Skellig); two Whitbread Awards; the U.S. Michael L. Printz Award for young-adult books (Kit's Wilderness); the Smarties Prize, ages 9–11 years (The Fire-Eaters); the U.S. Boston Globe–Horn Book Award, Children's Fiction (The Fire-Eaters); the Guardian Children's Fiction Prize (A Song for Ella Grey);
 Le Prix Sorcieres (France); 
the Katholischer Kinder-und Jugendbuchpreis (Germany); and a Silver Pencil and three Silver Kisses (Netherlands).

The Skellig prequel My Name is Mina (Hodder, 2010) was a finalist for three major annual awards: the Guardian Children's Fiction Prize,
the Carnegie Medal, and the (German) Deutscher Jugendliteraturpreis.
Almond was awarded the International Nonino Prize  for 2022.

Almond was appointed Officer of the Order of the British Empire (OBE) in the 2021 Birthday Honours for services to literature.

Works

 Sleepless Nights (Cullercoats, Tyne and Wear: Iron Press, 1985), collection
 A Kind of Heaven (Iron Press, 1997), collection
 Skellig (Hodder Children's Books, 1998) 
 Kit's Wilderness (Hodder, 1999)
 Counting Stars (Hodder, 2000), collection
 Heaven Eyes (Hodder, 2000) 
 Secret Heart (Hodder, 2001)
 Where Your Wings Were (Hodder, March 2002), collection – World Book Day selection from Counting Stars, 
 The Fire Eaters (Hodder, 2003)
   Clay (Hodder, 2005) 
 My Dad's a Birdman, illus. Polly Dunbar (Walker Books, 2007) 
 Jackdaw Summer (Hodder, 2008); US title, Raven Summer
 The Boy Who Climbed Into the Moon, illus. Dunbar (Walker, 2010) 
 My Name is Mina (Hodder, 2010) – prequel to Skellig
 The True Tale of the Monster Billy Dean (Penguin, 2011)
 The Boy Who Swam With Piranhas, illus. Oliver Jeffers (Walker, 2012)
 Mouse Bird Snake Wolf, illus. Dave McKean (Walker, 2013) 
 A Song for Ella Grey (Hodder, 2014)
 The Tightrope Walkers (Penguin, 2014)
 The Tale of Angelino Brown (Walker Books, 2017)
 The Colour of the Sun (Hodder, 2018)
 War Is Over, illus. David Litchfield (Hodder, 2018)
 Brand New Boy, (Walker Books, 2020)
 Annie Lumsden, the Girl from the Sea, illus. Beatrice Alemagna (Candlewick Press, 2021)

Picture books and graphic novels
 Kate, the Cat and the Moon, illus. Stephen Lambert (2004) 
 The Savage, illus. McKean (2008) 
 Slog's Dad, illus. McKean (2009) 
 The Dam, illus. Levi Pinfold (2018)
 The Woman Who Turned Children Into Birds, illus. Laura Carlin (Walker Books, 2022)

Plays 

 Wild Girl, Wild Boy (2002)
 My Dad's a Birdman
 Noah & the Fludd 
 Skellig (2002), adaptation of his novel
 Heaven Eyes, adaptation of his novel

Personal life 
Almond now lives in Newcastle upon Tyne. He has a daughter, Freya.

See also

 Click, a work of collaborative fiction to which Almond contributed

Notes

References

External links
 
 David Almond at Walker Books
 
 
 
 Interview with David Almond at BBC Blast 
 "Caedmon, the Oldest Surviving English Poet" (audio), David Almond on Cædmon, BBC Radio 3 Anglo-Saxon Portraits, broadcast 23 January 2013
 

1951 births
Living people
Alumni of the University of East Anglia
Academics of Bath Spa University
English children's writers
Carnegie Medal in Literature winners
Hans Christian Andersen Award for Writing winners
Michael L. Printz Award winners
Costa Book Award winners
Fellows of the Royal Society of Literature
Writers from Newcastle upon Tyne
People from Felling
Writers from Tyne and Wear
Officers of the Order of the British Empire
Guardian Children's Fiction Prize winners